Stepan Zorian (Armenian: Ստեփան Զօրեան, 1867–1919), better known by his nom de guerre Rostom, was one of the three founders of the Armenian Revolutionary Federation and a leader of the Armenian national liberation movement.

Founding of the ARF
Zorian was born in the village of Tsghna in the Erivan Governorate of the Russian Empire (now located in the Nakhchivan Autonomous Republic of Azerbaijan). He attended college in Moscow but dropped out before graduating. He eventually went to Tiflis, Georgia, where he met  Christapor Mikaelian and Simon Zavarian, all would become revolutionaries. They co-founded the Armenian Revolutionary Federation (ARF) in 1890. Their new political party had a major impact on Armenians. It gained support by demanding reforms and taking up arms to defend Armenian citizens of the Ottoman Empire.

Works and travels
Zorian moved to Geneva, Switzerland  where he managed the Droshak Journal (Troshag) newspaper, as the editor. In Karin, pretending to be a teapot salesman because ARF party members were banned in Turkey, he established student unions. He later settled in Bulgaria to create cooperation between ARF and the Internal Macedonian Revolutionary Organization in its struggle against Abdul Hamid II. He also opened an Armenian school there with his wife, Lisa Melik Shahnazarian.

Post Constitution days
During the 1908 Constitutional revolution in Turkey, he moved to Garin. In 1914, World War I broke out, he moved to Europe and then to the Caucasus. There he participated in the Armenian-Tatar wars. During the Iranian Constitutional Revolution, he participated in the revolution alongside Persian revolutionaries. He also directs the fight of self-defense in Baku. After a disastrous result, he fled to Iran with thousands of Armenians.

Death
Zorian died in 1919 in Tiflis, aged 52. He was the only founder of the ARF to live to see an independent Armenia.

References

Sources
 Rosdom biography in Armenian and English
 Mihran Kurdoghlian, Badmoutioun Hayots, C. Hador (translated from the Armenian), Armenian History, volume III, p. 34, Athens, Greece: 1996

See also
 Armenian Revolutionary Federation
 Democratic Republic of Armenia
 Christapor Mikaelian
 Simon Zavarian

1867 births
1919 deaths
Armenian revolutionaries
People from the Nakhchivan Autonomous Republic
People of the Persian Constitutional Revolution
Armenian independence activists
Armenian expatriates in Bulgaria